The European eel (Anguilla anguilla) is a species of eel, a snake-like, catadromous fish.

Eels have been important sources of food both as adults (including jellied eels of East London) and as glass eels. Glass-eel fishing using basket traps has been of significant economic value in many river estuaries on the western seaboard of Europe.

While the species' lifespan in the wild has not been determined, captive specimens have lived over 80 years. A specimen known as "the Brantevik Eel" lived for 155 years in the well of a family home in Brantevik, a fishing village in southern Sweden.

Conservation status 

The European eel is a critically endangered species. Since the 1970s, the numbers of eels reaching Europe is thought to have declined by around 90% (possibly even 98%). Contributing factors include overfishing, parasites such as Anguillicola crassus, barriers to migration such as hydroelectric dams, and natural changes in the North Atlantic oscillation, Gulf Stream, and North Atlantic drift. Recent work suggests polychlorinated biphenyl (PCB) pollution may be a factor in the decline. TRAFFIC is introducing traceability and legality systems throughout trade change to control the decline and encourage a U-turn on the species. The species is listed in Appendix II of the CITES Convention.

Sustainable consumption 
In 2010, Greenpeace International added the European eel to its "seafood red list", and the Sustainable Eel Group launched the Sustainable Eel Standard.

Breeding projects 
As the European eel population has been falling for some time, several projects have been started. In 1997, Innovatie Netwerk in the Netherlands initiated a project where they attempted to get European eels to breed in captivity by simulating the  journey from Europe to the Sargasso Sea with a swimming machine for the fish.

The first to achieve some success was DTU Aqua, a part of the Technical University of Denmark. Through a combination of fresh and salt water, as well as hormones, they were able to breed it in captivity in 2006 and make the larvae survive for 4.5 days after hatching. By 2007, DTU Aqua scientists were able to set a new record where the larvae survived for 12 days by feeding the mother eel with a special arginine-enriched diet. At this age the content of the larval yolk sac has been used, the mouth and digestive channel have developed, and it requires feeding. Attempts with various substances failed. Deep water sampling of the presumed habitat of larval European eel in the Sargasso Sea was performed by the Galathea 3 expedition in 2006–07, in the hope of revealing the likely feeding preference at the early stage. Their results indicated that they feed on various planktonic organisms, but especially microscopic jellyfish. A follow-up expedition was performed by DTU's own research ship to the Sargasso Sea region in 2014.

To further the research, the PRO-EEL project, led by DTU Aqua and involving several research institutes elsewhere in Denmark (University of Copenhagen and others), Norway (Norwegian Institute of Fisheries and Food Research and others), the Netherlands (Leiden University and others), Belgium (Ghent University), France (French National Center for Scientific Research and others), Spain (ICTA at Polytechnic University of Valencia) and Tunisia (National Institute of Marine Sciences and Technologies), was started in 2010. By 2014, the eel larvae at their facilities typically survive 20–22 days, but the full life cycle has still not been completed in captivity.

Life history 

Much of the European eel's life history was a mystery for centuries, as fishermen never caught anything they could identify as a young eel. Unlike many other migrating fish, eels begin their life cycle in the ocean and spend most of their lives in fresh inland water, or brackish coastal water, returning to the ocean to spawn and then die. In the early 1900s, Danish researcher Johannes Schmidt identified the Sargasso Sea as the most likely spawning grounds for European eels. The larvae (leptocephali) drift towards Europe in a 300-day migration.

When approaching the European coast, the larvae metamorphose into a transparent larval stage called "glass eel", enter estuaries, and many start migrating upstream. After entering their continental habitat, the glass eels metamorphose into elvers, miniature versions of the adult eels. As the eel grows, it becomes known as a "yellow eel" due to the brownish-yellow color of their sides and belly. After 5–20 years in fresh or brackish water, the eels become sexually mature, their eyes grow larger, their flanks become silver, and their bellies white in color. In this stage, the eels are known as "silver eels", and they begin their migration back to the Sargasso Sea to spawn. Silvering is important in an eel's development because it allows for increased levels of the steroid hormone cortisol, which is needed for their migration from fresh water back to the sea. Cortisol plays a role in the long migration because it allows for the mobilization of energy during migration. Also playing a key role in silvering is the production of the steroid 11-Ketotestosterone (11-KT), which prepares the eel for structural changes to the skin to endure the migration from fresh water to saltwater.

Magnetoreception has also been reported in the European eel by at least one study, and may be used for navigation.

Ecology

Parasites 
Parasite species infecting the European eel include Bothriocephalus claviceps and a range of other intestinal metazoans.

European eels generally have a low parasite diversity within individuals and ecosystems (component community). The parasite that is most commonly dominant is the acanthocephalan Acanthocephalus lucii.

Commercial fisheries

References

External links 
 

Amphibious fish
European eel
Critically endangered animals
European eel
Fish of Europe
Fish of the Baltic Sea
Fish of the Black Sea
Fish of the Mediterranean Sea
Fish of the North Sea
Freshwater fish of Europe
Taxa named by Carl Linnaeus